Radu Gabrea (20 June 1937 – 9 February 2017) was a Romanian film director and screenwriter. He directed more than twenty films between 1969 and 2016. He showed his first film in the Locarno Festival.

Selected filmography
  (1981)
  (1984)
 Ein Unding der Liebe (1988, TV film)
 The Secret of the Ice Cave (1989)
  (1993)
 Gruber's Journey (2008)

References

External links

1937 births
2017 deaths
Romanian film directors
Romanian screenwriters
Film people from Bucharest